Sarlat Cathedral (Cathédrale Saint-Sacerdos de Sarlat) is a Roman Catholic church and former cathedral located in Sarlat-la-Canéda, France. It is a national monument.

The Diocese of Sarlat was established in 1317 with a number of bishoprics in the region in the aftermath of the suppression of the Albigensians. The new bishop of Sarlat was the abbot of the ancient Sarlat Abbey, the church of which became the cathedral. Rebuilding began in 1504, but was not completed until the 1680s. (The belfry dates from the 9th century). The diocese was abolished under the Concordat of 1801 and its territory was transferred to the Diocese of Périgueux.

The dedication refers to Saint Sacerdos rather than to the Latin term sacerdos ("priest").  There are two French saints called Sacerdos, but the cathedral refers to Sacerdos of Limoges, whose relics it received during the Middle Ages.

References

External links

 

Former cathedrals in France
Churches in Dordogne